Yuri Ivanovich Reznik (born 13 August 1954) is a former Ukrainian professional footballer and coach.

Club career
He made his professional debut in the Soviet Second League in 1971 for FC Stroitel Poltava.

Honours
 Soviet Top League runner-up: 1975, 1983.
 Soviet Top League bronze: 1978.

European club competitions
With FC Dynamo Moscow.

 European Cup Winners' Cup 1979–80: 3 games.
 UEFA Cup 1980–81: 2 games.

References

1954 births
Sportspeople from Poltava
Living people
Soviet footballers
Ukrainian footballers
Soviet Top League players
FC Vorskla Poltava players
FC Shakhtar Donetsk players
FC Dynamo Moscow players
FC Spartak Moscow players
Soviet football managers
Association football forwards 
Association football midfielders